The dwarf water cobra (Naja nana) is a small, venomous species of aquatic cobra found in the Democratic Republic of Congo (Katanga). It was first described by Marcel Collet and Jean-Francois Trape in 2020, based on two specimens from Lake Mai-Ndombe.

Taxonomy
Naja nana is classified under the genus Naja of the family Elapidae, and considered a member of the Boulengerina subgenus, along with related species such as Naja annulata, Naja christyi, and Naja melanoleuca.  The genus name Naja is a Latinisation of the Sanskrit word , meaning "cobra”; the species name nana derives from the Latin word, nanus, which means feminine, in reference to its small size.

Description

Distinguishing features of the species include its characteristic defensive posture, its aquatic lifestyle, the straight-row arrangement of its dorsal scales, and its distinctive coloration: black with small white or yellowish spots, a whitish abdomen, and a black underside of the tail.

The eggs of the dwarf water cobra are large and elongated, and require 70 days of incubation to hatch.

Behavior

Dwarf water cobras can swim and climb, but generally prefer a terrestrial habitat, although they will hunt and defecate in water when able. In the wild they are exclusively piscivorous, although in captivity they are often fed a rodent-based diet. One case of cannibalism of a conspecific snake is known.

References

Naja
Snakes of Africa
Reptiles described in 2020